Ernest Roy Bird (13 October 1883 - 27 September 1933)  was a British solicitor and Member of Parliament, who represented Skipton as a Unionist between 1924 and his death in 1933.

Life
Bird was educated at St. Paul's School, London and became a solicitor.

Bird was a founder of the Junior Imperial League, a precursor to the Young Conservatives. He became a parliamentary candidate after the First World War, when he unsuccessfully contested Lambeth North in the 1922 and 1923 general elections, and was elected for Skipton at the 1924 general election, after the incumbent MP retired. He was re-elected with a comfortable majority in 1929 and 1931.

In Parliament, one of Bird's achievements was the Solicitors Act 1933.

He died in September 1933, while on a visit to South Africa.

Family
Bird married in 1909 Nettie Constantine Greenland, daughter of George Greenland.  They had two daughters; Ursula married Charles Kimber in December 1933 (marriage dissolved 1949), and Pamela married Henry Nelson, later Baron Nelson, in 1940.

References

External links
 

UK MPs 1924–1929
UK MPs 1929–1931
UK MPs 1931–1935
Conservative Party (UK) MPs for English constituencies
20th-century British politicians
1883 births
1933 deaths